Mazaediothecium mohamedii is a species of corticolous (bark-dwelling) and crustose lichen in the family Pyrenulaceae. It is found in Peninsular Malaysia.

Taxonomy
The lichen was formally described as a new species in 2007 by Hiroshi Harada and Yoshikazu Yamamoto. It is only known to occur at the type locality. The species epithet mohamedii refers to Professor Haji Mohamed, who arranged the field survey where this specimen was collected.

Description
Mazaediothecium mohamedii has a dull, cracked, pale creamy yellow thallus that lacks a cortex. It has perithecioid ascomata (flask-shaped structures opened by a pore) measuring 0.2–0.5 mm in diameter and 0.2–0.7 mm high. The spore mass occurs in the ostioles as dark brown mazaedia (where the ascus walls break down to leave a dry, loose, amorphous, powdery, mass of spores together with disintegrating asci and paraphyses). Individual ascospores are brown, more or less ellipsoid in shape, and measure 8–11 by 6–8 μm. The photobiont partner of the lichen is a species of green alga from the genus Trentepohlia. Mazaediothecium mohamedii contains lichexanthone, a lichen product that causes the thallus to fluoresce golden yellow when lit with a long-wavelength UV light.

References

Pyrenulales
Lichen species
Lichens described in 2007
Lichens of Malaysia